Pedro Miguel Cardoso Monteiro (born 2 May 1978), commonly known as Pelé, is a former professional footballer who played as a central defender or a defensive midfielder.

He spent most of his 24-year senior career in England, representing West Bromwich Albion in the Premier League.

Club career

Portugal
Born in Albufeira, Portugal, Pelé started playing professionally for local Imortal DC, moving to Algarve neighbours S.C. Farense after five seasons and spending one year in the Segunda Liga. He also played from 1999 to 2001 with his first club at that level.

Pelé joined C.F. Os Belenenses for 2003–04, making his Primeira Liga debut on 1 August 2003 in a 1–1 home draw with U.D. Leiria. The following campaign, already an important first-team element, he scored the game's only goal for the former at home against Sporting CP on 6 March 2005.

Southampton
Pelé signed for Southampton for an undisclosed fee – believed to be £1 million – on 19 July 2006. He had attracted the attention of Premiership club West Ham United and Portsmouth, but decided to opt for the potential of the Championship side, where he was likely to get more games.

On 30 December 2006, Pelé scored his first competitive goal for the Saints, against Leicester City. He started the season in his natural central defensive position but was eventually moved into defensive midfield, playing alongside Jermaine Wright while also moving back into defence to cover for injuries to Darren Powell and Claus Lundekvam.

West Bromwich Albion
On 9 August 2007, Pelé signed with West Bromwich Albion for £1 million on a two-year contract. He made his official debut as a second-half substitute in a 2–1 defeat away to Burnley, on the opening day of 2007–08.

Pelé made 13 starts during the campaign, in a promotion to the top flight.

Later years
Pelé was released by West Brom in the summer of 2009 following their relegation, with only three league appearances from the player. On 12 November, he moved to Falkirk of the Scottish Premiership as a free agent.

In August 2010, Pelé joined Milton Keynes Dons on a non-contract deal, as cover for injured Gary MacKenzie and suspended Mathias Kouo-Doumbé. He was released by the club the following month, without any league matches.

In January 2011, aged nearly 33, Pelé signed with Northwich Victoria of the Northern Premier League Premier Division on non-contract terms, and made his debut in a 1–0 win over Mickleover Sports. In June he put his name on the PFA's free transfer availability list, indicating that he was seeking a new club.

Pelé left Hednesford Town on 8 January 2012, and joined Conference Premier's Hayes & Yeading United nine days later. He made his debut for his new team the same evening, against Ebbsfleet United.

In July 2016, 38-year-old Pelé signed for A.F.C. Totton from Havant & Waterlooville.

International career
After turning down invitations in the past, Pelé accepted an invitation to play for Cape Verde, starting appearing for the nation in the 2008 Africa Cup of Nations qualification stage.

References

External links

 (2nd part)

1978 births
Living people
People from Albufeira
Portuguese people of Cape Verdean descent
Citizens of Cape Verde through descent
Sportspeople from Faro District
Black Portuguese sportspeople
Portuguese footballers
Cape Verdean footballers
Association football defenders
Association football midfielders
Association football utility players
Primeira Liga players
Liga Portugal 2 players
Segunda Divisão players
Imortal D.C. players
S.C. Farense players
C.F. Os Belenenses players
Premier League players
English Football League players
National League (English football) players
Northern Premier League players
Southampton F.C. players
West Bromwich Albion F.C. players
Milton Keynes Dons F.C. players
Northwich Victoria F.C. players
Hednesford Town F.C. players
Hayes & Yeading United F.C. players
Havant & Waterlooville F.C. players
A.F.C. Totton players
Scottish Premier League players
Falkirk F.C. players
Cape Verde international footballers
Cape Verdean expatriate footballers
Expatriate footballers in England
Expatriate footballers in Scotland
Cape Verdean expatriate sportspeople in England
Cape Verdean expatriate sportspeople in Scotland